Charles Dutton, 7th Baron Sherborne (13 May 1911 – 25 December 1982), was a British peer.

Background
Charles Thomas Sherborne Dutton was the son of Lt. Col. James Huntly Dutton, 6th Baron Sherborne, and Ethel Mary Baird.

Career
Dutton was a ferry pilot with the Air Transport Auxiliary between 1940 and 1945. He was one of at least four one-armed ATA pilots. His right arm was amputated due to a congenital birth defect. He was a Member of Gloucestershire County Council between 1955 and 1964.

Family
On 20 February 1943, Dutton married Joan Molesworth Jenkinson (née Dunn, widow of John Anthony Jenkinson; d. 1982), the 3rd daughter of Sir James Hamet Dunn, 1st Bt. and Gertrude Paterson Price.  They had no children.

On his death, the Barony of Sherborne passed to a cousin, Ralph Stawell Dutton.

References

External links
 Painting of Charles Dutton as a boy

1911 births
1983 deaths
People from Gloucestershire
English farmers
English landowners
English politicians
Air Transport Auxiliary pilots
Charles
20th-century British businesspeople